Creek, also known as Georgia Camp, is an unincorporated community in Houston County, Texas, United States. The community was founded after the Civil War, and by the 1880s it had a school and a post office. At its peak in the 1890s, the community had a population of 150 and many businesses; by the 1990s, its population was scattered and it had only retained its church and cemetery.

References

Unincorporated communities in Houston County, Texas
Unincorporated communities in Texas